Rinze Visser (18 December 1938) is a Dutch communist politician and councilor for the New Communist Party of the Netherlands (NCPN) in the municipality of De Fryske Marren. With over fifty years of continuous council membership, he is the longest-serving politician of the Netherlands and one of its last communist MPs.

Career
Visser was born in 1938 in Lemmer and came into contact with communist ideology at an early age through his father. Visser became a member of the Communist Party of the Netherlands (CPN) in 1958 at the age of 21 and was first elected to the municipal council of Lemsterland in 1970. In 1978, Visser visited the German Democratic Republic with a CPN delegation and met Erich Honecker.

Visser became a member of the League of Communists in the Netherlands (VCN) in 1985, a split from the CPN that did not agree with the CPN's change of course in the late 1980s. In particular, Visser opposes the movement within the CPN that wanted the party to merge into a broad progressive movement. On behalf of the VCN, he was re-elected to the municipal council of Lemsterland in 1986 and 1990. He was the sole elected representative of the VCN.

When the CPN ceased to exist in 1991, the VCN, alongside a number of local communist groups, merged into the New Communist Party of the Netherlands. Visser remained a councilor in Lemsterland on behalf of the NCPN. In 2014, Lemsterland was merged into the new municipality of De Fryske Marren. Due to wide support in his native Lemmer (and in spite of slim support in the rest of the municipality), Visser won his re-election, though only as a one-man faction. In 2018, the NCPN went on to win an additional seat for Sake Barelds, though this seat was lost in the following election.

Visser stood as a candidate for the House of Representatives several times. In 1986 as number two of the VCN and in 1989 as its lijsttrekker. Visser again became the lead candidate on behalf of the NCPN in 1994. In 1998 and 2003 he was placed respectively third and fifth on the ballot.

In addition to his council membership, Visser writes a column for Manifest, the monthly newspaper of the NCPN. Before his retirement, Visser worked in shipping.

References

External link
 NCPN Lemmer - De Fryske Marren (in Dutch) - The website of the NCPN in De Fryske Marren with regular columns by Rinze Visser

1938 births
Living people
Dutch communists
Communist Party of the Netherlands politicians
Municipal councillors in Friesland